WARP-01, nicknamed Nichirin, was a 1U-sized CubeSat developed and operated by Warpspace, a newspace company based in Tsukuba, Japan. It was launched on 20 February 2021 on board a Cygnus cargo spacecraft, and deployed from the International Space Station (ISS) on 14 March 2021. WARP-01 was used for technology validation and monitoring the radio wave and radiation environment in space.

Overview
WARP-01 was Warpspace's first satellite. The company signed a contract to deploy a satellite from the ISS's Kibo Module with Space BD on 24 August 2018. Inside the satellite were several wedding memorial plaques,  which were sent to space as part of a 'space bridal service'. At the time the service was first announced in July 2018, media reports said that astronauts staying on the ISS were to take photographs of the satellite during its deployment. WARP-01 was unveiled during an event in Tsukuba city in February 2020. WARP-01 was launched and carried to space on board Cygnus NG-15. WARP-01 tested a radiation sensor, which was used to monitor the radiation environment in low Earth orbit.

WARP-01 decayed from orbit on 1 May 2022.

See also
 OPUSAT-II
 RSP-01
 STARS-EC

References

External links
 WARP-01

Satellites of Japan
2021 in Japan
Spacecraft launched in 2021
Spacecraft which reentered in 2022